TrackTown USA is a non-governmental, not-for-profit 501(c)(3) organization
based in Eugene, Oregon, United States.
The long history of the sport of track running in Eugene,
particularly at University of Oregon's Hayward Field,
earned the city its nickname as the "Track Capital of the World"
and as "TrackTown USA." So the term "TrackTown USA" may refer to the nonprofit organization, Hayward Field, the Eugene-Springfield region, or the entire state of Oregon.

Besides organizing track and field competitions, TrackTown USA also provides community track & field awareness and youth fitness development activities.

During track season, it holds a monthly town hall-style meeting at the Downtown Athletic Club called "TrackTown Tuesday."

Popular culture
The 1998 movie Without Limits  was about the distance runner Steve Prefontaine and his coach Bill Bowerman, shot on location in TrackTown USA.

The 2016 movie Tracktown was about a distance runner training for the Olympics in TrackTown USA.

Major competitions
TrackTown USA has hosted many major track and field competitions.

NCAA Track and Field Championships 
 1962
 1964
 1972
 1978
 1984
 1988
 1991
 1996
 2001
 2010
 2013
 2014
 2015
 2016
 2017
 2018
 2021
 2022

USA Outdoor Track and Field Championships 
 1971 (men)
 1975 (men)
 1986
 1993
 1999
 2001
 2008
 2009
 2011
 2012
 2015
 2016
 2020
 2022

United States Olympic Trials 

 1972
 1976
 1980
 2008
 2012
 2016
 2020

World Athletics Championships 
 1989 World Masters Athletics Championships
 2014 World Junior Championships in Athletics
 2022 World Athletics Championships

References

External links

Athletics organizations